A crystal filter allows some frequencies to 'pass' through  an electrical circuit while attenuating undesired frequencies. An electronic filter can use quartz crystals as resonator components of a filter circuit. Quartz crystals are piezoelectric, so their mechanical characteristics can affect electronic circuits (see mechanical filter). In particular, quartz crystals can exhibit mechanical resonances with a very high Q factor (from 10,000 to 100,000 and greater — far higher than conventional resonators built from inductors and capacitors). The crystal's stability and its high Q factor allow crystal filters to have precise center frequencies and steep band-pass characteristics. Typical crystal filter attenuation in the band-pass is approximately 2-3dB. Crystal filters are commonly used in communication devices such as radio receivers.

Crystal filters are used in the intermediate frequency (IF) stages of high-quality radio receivers. They are preferred because they are very stable mechanically and thus have little change in resonant frequency with changes in operating temperature. For the highest available stability applications, crystals are placed in ovens with controlled temperature making operating temperature independent of ambient temperature.

Cheaper sets may use ceramic filters built from ceramic resonators (which also exploit the piezoelectric effect) or tuned LC circuits. Very high quality "crystal ladder" filters can be constructed of serial arrays of crystals.

The most common use of crystal filters are at frequencies of 9 MHz or 10.7 MHz to provide selectivity in communications receivers, or at higher frequencies as a roofing filter in receivers using up-conversion. The vibrating frequencies of the crystal are determined by its "cut" (physical shape), such as the common AT cut used for crystal filters designed for radio communications. The cut also determines some temperature characteristics, which affect the stability of the resonant frequency, though as quartz has an inherently high temperature stability, its shape does not change much with temperatures found in typical radios.

By contrast, less expensive ceramic-based filters are commonly used with a frequency of 10.7 MHz to provide filtering of unwanted frequencies in consumer FM receivers. Additionally, a lower frequency (commonly of 455 kHz) can be used as the second intermediate frequency and have a piezoelectric-based filter. Ceramic filters at 455 kHz can achieve similar narrow bandwidths to crystal filters at 10.7 MHz.

The design concept for utilizing quartz crystals as a filtering component was first established by Walter Cady in 1922, but it was largely Warren P. Mason's work in the late 1920s and early 1930s that devised methods for incorporating crystals into LC lattice filter networks which set the groundwork for much of the progress in telephone communications. Crystal filter designs from the 1960s allowed for true Chebyshev, Butterworth, and other typical filter characteristics. Crystal filter design continued to improve in the 1970s and 1980s with the development of multi-pole monolithic filters, widely used today to provide IF selectivity in communication receivers. Crystal filters can be found today in radio communications, telecommunications, signal generation, and GPS devices.

See also
Crystal oscillator

References

Linear filters
Wireless tuning and filtering
Signal processing filter